Seneca is a village in LaSalle and Grundy counties in the U.S. state of Illinois. The population was 2,353 at the 2020 census, down from 2,371 at the 2010 census.

The LaSalle County portion of Seneca is part of the Ottawa Micropolitan Statistical Area, while the small portion that lies in Grundy County is part of the Chicago–Naperville–Joliet Metropolitan Statistical Area.

History

The village of Seneca, formerly named Crotty after our founder, Jeremiah Crotty, was incorporated in 1865.  Our town was created during the construction of the Illinois & Michigan Canal for which Crotty was a contractor. 

The Rock Island Railroad and the Illinois River also supported the creation and business of our town. Seneca is most known for its contributions during World War II when Chicago Bridge and Iron operated the Prairie Shipyard.  157 Landing Ship Tanks (LST) were built here.

Geography
Seneca is located at  (41.3111442, -88.6097936).

Most of the village lies in LaSalle County, although a small portion extends into west central Grundy County. In the 2000 census, all of Seneca's 2,082 residents lived in LaSalle County. According to 2006 population estimates, 2,082 of the village's 2,087 residents (99.8%) lived in LaSalle County and 5 (0.2%) lived in Grundy County.

Seneca is located on the Illinois River, which connects Lake Michigan to the Mississippi River.

Demographics

As of the 2020 census there were 2,353 people, 950 households, and 758 families residing in the village. The racial makeup of the village was 90.95% White, 0.85% African American, 0.55% Native American, 0.47% Asian, 0.08% Pacific Islander, 1.15% from other races, and 5.95% from two or more races. Hispanic or Latino of any race were 4.38% of the population.

There were 950 households, out of which 69.05% had children under the age of 18 living with them, 48.95% were married couples living together, 19.89% had a female householder with no husband present, and 20.21% were non-families. 11.68% of all households were made up of individuals, and 6.11% had someone living alone who was 65 years of age or older. The average household size was 2.85 and the average family size was 2.67.

The village's age distribution consisted of 26.3% under the age of 18, 8.6% from 18 to 24, 23.4% from 25 to 44, 29.8% from 45 to 64, and 11.9% who were 65 years of age or older. The median age was 34.8 years. For every 100 females, there were 95.4 males. For every 100 females age 18 and over, there were 92.2 males.

The median income for a household in the village was $74,907, and the median income for a family was $87,813. Males had a median income of $62,895 versus $24,083 for females. The per capita income for the village was $34,832. About 13.1% of families and 15.2% of the population were below the poverty line, including 23.7% of those under age 18 and none of those age 65 or over.

Business

Seneca is located on the Illinois River, which connects the Mississippi River to Lake Michigan.  Seneca hosts three marinas on the south side of the Illinois River, as well as a public boat launch on the north side of the Illinois River.  Seneca is rich with history with the Illinois and Michigan Canal running through the center of the city's downtown area.  The business community continues to change as the small businesses and merchants unite to improve the existing business community and attract new businesses.

The Village has recently developed The Seneca Business Association which has united more than 100 businesses in the village.  The goal of the association is to promote local shopping as well as downtown revitalization.  The association has already developed a business directory and coordinated a number of fundraisers for local non-profit agencies.

Seneca participates in the Mapping & Visioning for your Community project.  The group of local volunteers establish goals community improvement goals and enlists the help of a VISTA Volunteer to accomplish the goals.  The group also hopes to apply for grants to better the community.

Schools
Seneca has three schools split into two school districts: Seneca Grade School North Campus (pre-kindergarten - 4th grade) and Seneca Grade School South Campus (grades 5-8) make up District 170, while Seneca Township High School (grades 9 - 12) is the lone school in District 160. Seneca High School houses students from Seneca as well as students from the nearby towns of Mazon, Verona, Kinsman, and Marseilles.

The 2005 Illinois State Board of Education's 2005 Illinois District Report Card ISBE 2005 Report Card shows that the Seneca High School was strongly funded - in large part through payments made by Commonwealth Edison's power generation plant located approximately ten miles south of Seneca.  For example, the above cited 2005 high school district Report Card shows the Illinois State average instructional expenditure per pupil at $5,216, but Seneca was able to provide $8,647 in instructional expenditures per pupil.  Similarly, while the state average operating expenditure per pupil was $8,786, Seneca was able to dedicate $17,305 per pupil, which is reflected in the grade school, middle school, and high school facilities. These payments made by Commonwealth Edison have since decreased along with the impact they once had.

In 1986, the Seneca Lady Irish basketball team won the Class 1A State Championship with a 30-0 record.
In 1989, the Seneca Fighting Irish Cross Country team won the Class 1A State Championship and were the first boys team from LaSalle County to win a state championship.
In 1990, the Seneca Fighting Irish Track team's 3200 m relay team won the Class 1A State Championship.
In 1990, the Seneca Fighting Irish football team won the Class 2A State Championship with a 14-0 record.
In 1991, the Seneca Lady Irish basketball team finished as the Class 1A State Runner-up with a 28-1 record.
In 1991, the Seneca Fighting Irish basketball team finished as the Class 1A State Runner-up with a 27-5 record.
In 1992, the Seneca Lady Irish cross country team finished as the Class 1A State Runner-up.
In 2005, the Seneca Fighting Irish basketball team placed third in the Class 1A State Championship with a 33-1 record.
In 2006, the Seneca Fighting Irish basketball team won the Class 1A State Championship with a 35-0 record.
The Seneca High School FFA has been voted as the top chapter of the National FFA Organization in the State of Illinois.
∗In 2018, Christopher Collet won the IHSA State Cross Country Championships.

∗In 2019, Christopher Collet won the 1600m and 3200m run at the IHSA State Track meet.

Notable people

 Dave Callahan, outfielder with the Cleveland Naps, born in Seneca
 John Tracy Ellis, Catholic church historian, born in Seneca

See also
Seneca Grain Elevator
Seneca Station (Illinois)

References

External links
Village of Seneca
Seneca on USGS

 

Villages in Grundy County, Illinois
Villages in Illinois
Ottawa, IL Micropolitan Statistical Area
Villages in LaSalle County, Illinois
Populated places established in 1854
1854 establishments in Illinois